W. Eugene Page was an early 20th-century performing artist who made records with Victor. He was considered a virtuoso on the mandolin, and played marimbaphone, banjo and mandola as well.

He toured with his performing company, The Eugene Page concert company as part of the Chautauqua movement. Members included Page on mandolin; Florence Phelps McCune also on mandolin; Emma McDonald, violincello, and Signor Innocenrio Zito, harp.

Recordings

Page made 5 commercial recordings with Victor Records
 La della (W. Eugene Page mandolin ; D. F. Ramseyer harp guitar)
 Mobile prance (W. Eugene Page mandolin ; D. F. Ramseyer harp guitar)
 Tipica polka (W. Eugene Page mandolin ; D. F. Ramseyer harp guitar. Composed by Carlo Curti.
 Mobile prance (Roy Butin harp guitar ; W. Eugene Page mandolin)
Polka scherzo (Roy Butin harp guitar ; W. Eugene Page mandolin

References

External links
 Library of Congress online recordings of W. Eugene Page.
 1906 advertisement for William C. Sherman, that said he was a pupil of Page and called Page a virtuoso. Column 1
 Short bio of Page with 2 announcement flyers.
 Flyer for other members of the Chautauqua movement that Page was part of. Arthur Wells and Clay Smith, both multi-instrumentalists that played mandolin.

American performance artists
American classical mandolinists
Year of birth missing
Year of death missing